The 2006 United States House of Representatives elections in South Carolina were held on November 7, 2006 to select six Representatives for two-year terms from the state of South Carolina.  The primary elections for the Democrats and the Republicans were held on June 13 and the runoff elections were held two weeks later on June 27.  All six incumbents were re-elected and the composition of the state delegation remained four Republicans and two Democrats.

Overview

District 1

Congressman Henry E. Brown, Jr. ran for a fourth term in this conservative, South Caroline coastal district and faced Democratic candidate Randy Maatta and Green Party candidate James Dunn. Though Brown was re-elected by a comfortable margin, it was a smaller margin than in previous elections.

District 2

Congressman Joe Wilson ran for re-election in this conservative district that starts along the South Carolina coastline and reaches into the central region of the state. Wilson faced Democratic candidate Michael Ellisor in a repeat of the 2004 election, and, though he was re-elected, his margin of victory was reduced somewhat by the Democratic wave sweeping through the country.

District 3

Though Congressman J. Gresham Barrett represented the most conservative district in South Carolina, he was held to just over sixty percent of the vote by Democratic candidate Lee Ballenger in 2006, in part due to the anti-Republican sentiment nationwide.

District 4

Republican Congressman Bob Inglis, seeking his fifth term overall and his second consecutive term, faced off against Democratic candidate William Griffith, Libertarian John Cobin, and Green candidate C. Faye Walters, which he won handily. This district, based in Spartanburg and Greenville, has a tendency to elect Republicans.

District 5

Long-serving Democratic Congressman John Spratt, in a bid for his thirteenth term, faced a credible challenge from State Representative Ralph Norman. Though Spratt's margin of victory was reduced from previous levels, he was still able to edge out Norman with nearly fifty-seven percent of the vote in this conservative, northern district.

District 6

Facing off against Republican challenger Gary McLeod for the third time in this staunchly liberal, African-American majority district, incumbent Democratic Congressman Jim Clyburn overwhelmingly won election to an eighth term in Congress.

See also
United States House of Representatives elections, 2006
South Carolina gubernatorial election, 2006
South Carolina state elections, 2006

References

External links
South Carolina Election Returns

South Carolina

2006
2006 South Carolina elections